Geeps may refer to:

 nickname for the EMD General Purpose (GP) Series, a series of four-axle (B-B) road switcher diesel-electric locomotives
 other name for Zips